Viktor Eduardovich Minibaev (born 18 July 1991) is a Russian diver who has won medals at World and European level and competed at three Olympic Games.

Career 
Minibaev's first major international medal came in the men's synchronized 10 metre platform event at the 2010 European Championships.

Minibaev competed at the 2012 Summer Olympics in the men's synchronized 10 metre platform (with Ilya Zakharov) and the men's 10 m platform.  At the European Championships that year, he won silver in both events.

With Artem Chesakov, Minibaev won silver at the 2013 World Championships in the men's synchronised 10 m platform event.  In 2015, in a World Championships on home ground in Kazan, Minibaev won a bronze medal in that event with Roman Izmailov.  At the 2014 European Championships, Minibaev won gold in the men's 10 m platform and gold in the team event.

At the 2016 Summer Olympics, he competed in the same events, teaming with Nikita Shleykher in the synchronised 10 m platform event.  At the European Championships that year, he again won gold in the mixed team event, and silver in the men's 10 m platform.

In 2017, he won World Championship men's synchronised 10 m platform silver again, this time with Aleksandr Bondar.  The team won silver again at the 2019 World Championships.  Minibaev also won silver in the mixed synchronised 10 m platform at that event, with Ekaterina Beliaeva.  In 2018, he won European gold in the men's synchronised 10 m platform event.

References

External links

1991 births
Russian male divers
Divers at the 2012 Summer Olympics
Divers at the 2016 Summer Olympics
Olympic divers of Russia
Tatar people of Russia
Tatar sportspeople
Living people
World Aquatics Championships medalists in diving
Universiade medalists in diving
Universiade silver medalists for Russia
Divers from Moscow
Divers at the 2020 Summer Olympics
Medalists at the 2020 Summer Olympics
Olympic medalists in diving
Olympic bronze medalists for the Russian Olympic Committee athletes